Oscilla annulata is a species of sea snail, a marine gastropod mollusk in the family Pyramidellidae, the pyrams and their allies.

Description
The length of the whitish shell measures 5 mm. The numerous whorls of the teleoconch are flattened, and spirally ribbed.  Their interstices are longitudinally striated. The columella has a single posterior plication. The lip is subcrenulated, the interior lirate.

Distribution
This marine species occurs in the demersal zone off the Philippines, Singapore and Japan.

References

Pyramidellidae
Gastropods described in 1855